Derk Geertsz Boswijk (born 8 April 1989) is a Dutch politician serving as a member of the House of Representatives since the 2021 general election. A member of the Christian Democratic Appeal (CDA), he previously held a seat in the States of Utrecht from 2015 to 2021 and chaired his party's caucus during the last two of those years.

Early life and education 
Boswijk was born in 1989 in the Utrecht city Woerden. His father worked as manager of a packaging materials factory. He attended the high school Driestar College in Gouda at  level between 2001 and 2005 and was subsequently trained in engineering at the  school ROC ASA in Utrecht until 2009. He would later during his career also obtain an  degree in Industrial Engineering & Management from the Amsterdam University of Applied Sciences (2013) and a master's degree in Urban and Area Development from the HU University of Applied Sciences Utrecht and the Saxion University of Applied Sciences (2019).

Career 
While studying in Utrecht in 2006, Boswijk founded Ingenieursbureau Bosons, a business specialized in permits and architectural drawings. At the time, he was a supporter of the populist Party for Freedom. Besides, Boswijk wrote a book called  (Son of an emigrant) based on letters by his great-grandfather Cornelis Treur, who left the Netherlands in 1913 to live in United States. It came out in 2014. A historical novel written by Boswijk based on the same letters was released under the name  (Why I left) in 2017.

He participated in the 2015 provincial election in Utrecht as the CDA's sixth candidate and was elected to the States of Utrecht, where he focussed on the environment, mobility, and the economy. Boswijk kept working at Bosons until 2016, when he left to work as property developer at real estate investment firm Heyen Beheer. In the states-provincial, Boswijk tried to improve internet connections in rural areas, and he called for the province to do more to support family businesses. Boswijk was re-elected in the 2019 election as his party's  and became caucus leader. He also became a reserve officer (second lieutenant) in the Royal Netherlands Army the following year.

House of Representatives 
Boswijk was elected member of parliament in the March 2021 general election, being placed 14th on the CDA's party list. He received 1,603 preference votes after a campaign in which he talked about what he perceived as a lack of attention by the House of Representatives for people with a vocational education. Boswijk left Heyen Beheer, and he vacated his seat in the States of Utrecht the following month. In the House of Representatives, he became a member of the Committee for Agriculture, Nature and Food Quality; the Committee for Defence; the Committee for European Affairs; the Committee for Foreign Affairs; the Committee for Infrastructure and Water Management; the contact group United States (vice chair); and the Dutch parliamentary delegation to the NATO Assembly. His specialties are agriculture and defense.

While Boswijk served as the CDA's agricultural spokesperson in the House in July 2021, the party presented its new agricultural vision, which was characterized as a break from its past. It called shrinking the number of farm animals necessary in order to halve reactive nitrogen emissions by 2030 but said it was not a goal in itself. The CDA's plans also called for between €1.5 billion and €2 billion in funds per year to, among other things, assist farmers in developing and maintaining natural areas, which would allow them to make a living with fewer farm animals. To achieve this goal, he proposed the introduction of a new type of land in between agricultural and natural land he dubbed  (landscape land), which later became part of the coalition agreement of the fourth Rutte cabinet. Boswijk defended his plans during a speech at a farmers' protest the day after he had announced them. Boswijk later offered a five-step plan to nature and nitrogen policy minister Christianne van der Wal, in which he outlined a localized approach as opposed to a generic one to reduce reactive nitrogen emission. He also complained that the cabinet was mostly focused on cutting agricultural emissions while not creating as detailed plans for other sectors. In June 2022, Boswijk defied the advise of the counter-terrorism unit NCTV to not attend a farmer's protest in Stroe. Following a visit from a disgruntled farmer at his home later that month while his family was there, he announced that he would stay at home with his family for some days. Boswijk proposed in late 2022 that dairy companies should be forced to use at least a certain percentage of sustainable milk in their products. This would help the earning power of sustainable dairy farmers.

When Kabul was captured by the Taliban in August 2021, he called on the Dutch government to evacuate all Afghans who had assisted the Dutch army in the War in Afghanistan and were being threatened by the Taliban. He also had contact with people in Afghanistan in order to help them get evacuated. He criticized the government's evacuation operation, describing it as a "clusterfuck", and he successfully advocated an external investigation into the matter. In a profile in de Volkskrant, Boswijk was called an activist member of parliament for being critical of the governing coalition to which his party belonged, and he was therefore compared to Pieter Omtzigt, who had played a prominent role in uncovering the childcare benefits scandal and who had left the CDA earlier that year. During the Russian invasion of Ukraine, he pled for a reinstatement of conscription in order to relieve the personnel shortage of the Netherlands Armed Forces. He was in favor of a voluntary system similar to that of Sweden, where only motivated citizens are invited.

He again ran the CDA's national campaign fo the 2023 provincial elections.

Personal life 
Boswijk married Wilma Kroon in 2013, and they have two children. He resides in the village of Kockengen in the province Utrecht, having lived in nearby Wilnis before, and he is a member of the Reformed Association in the Protestant Church in the Netherlands. Boswijk tried to climb Mont Blanc in 2016 to raise money for the hearing loss foundation Hear the World, as his eldest daughter was born with the condition. He did not reach the summit but did manage to raise €8,000.

Bibliography 
 2014 – ; English translation: Son of an Immigrant
 2017 –  (Why I left)
 2020 –  (Theodore Roosevelt: The progressive populist)
 2022 –  (Hunger & war: Why one-liners will not solve complex issues)

References

External links 
 Personal website 

1989 births
Living people
21st-century Dutch male writers
21st-century Dutch non-fiction writers
21st-century Dutch novelists
21st-century Dutch politicians
Christian Democratic Appeal politicians
Dutch historical novelists
Dutch members of the Dutch Reformed Church
HU University of Applied Sciences Utrecht alumni
Members of the House of Representatives (Netherlands)
Members of the Provincial Council of Utrecht
People from Stichtse Vecht
People from Woerden
Dutch company founders
Dutch campaign managers